La Guzla, ou Choix de poesies illyriques, recueillies dans la Dalmatie, la Bosnie, La Croatie et l'Hertzegowine (The Guzla, or a Selection of Illyric Poems Collected in Dalmatia, Bosnia, Croatia and Herzegovina) was a 1827 literary hoax of  Prosper Mérimée.

It was presented as a collection of translations (in fact, pseudotranslations) of folk ballads narrated by a guzlar (gusle player) Hyacinthe Maglanović, complete with invented commentaries. Of 29 ballads, one of them, Triste ballade de la noble épouse d'Assan-Aga, was an authentic one.

The Russian poet Alexander Pushkin translated 11 ballads from La Guzla into his cycle .

References

External links
La Guzla, in: 
  (Project Gutenberg)

1827 poems
19th-century hoaxes
Works by Prosper Mérimée
Literary forgeries